Mohammad Ghazi is an Indian politician and a member of the 16th Legislative Assembly of Uttar Pradesh of India. He represents the Barhapur constituency of Uttar Pradesh and was a member of the Bahujan Samaj Party political party.

Early life and education
Ghazi was born in Bijnor district, Uttar Pradesh. He received education till ninth grade. Before being elected as MLA, he used to work as a businessperson.

Political career
Ghazi has been a MLA for two straight terms. He currently represents the Barhapur constituency and was a member of the Bahujan Samaj Party. During his first term, he represented Afzalgarh (Assembly constituency).

Controversy
On 7 January 2017, a criminal case was filed against Ghazi for threatening to send a Dhampur tehsildar to prison once the BSP assumed power after the upcoming Assembly elections. The tehsildar was removing political billboards in Sherkot when Ghazi made the threat while he and his supporters were attempting to prevent the tehsildar from removing the billboards. However, Ghazi claimed that the police were trying to file a false case against him on behalf of the ruling Samajwadi Party.

Posts held

See also
Barhapur
Uttar Pradesh Legislative Assembly
Government of India
Politics of India
Bahujan Samaj Party

References 

Bahujan Samaj Party politicians from Uttar Pradesh
Uttar Pradesh MLAs 2012–2017
Uttar Pradesh MLAs 2007–2012
People from Bijnor district
1974 births
Living people